The Le Châtelet-sur-Retourne–Juniville–Vouziers railway line was a  long railway line in the north of France with a gauge of initially  and later .

History

Narrow gauge and metre gauge railway 
Even after the ban on the use of metre gauge had been lifted and most of the lines of the operating company had been converted to metre gauge, the unusual gauge was still maintained.

The  narrow gauge section from Le Châtelet-sur-Retourne to Juniville was put into service on 10 December 1900 and inaugurated on 10 February 1901 by the Chemins de fer départementaux des Ardennes (CA). 

The narrow-gauge section from Juniville to Vouziers was put into service on 25 November 1906. The narrow-gauge line was converted to metre gauge in 1924.  It was operated until 1933.

German military railway 

During World War I, the German forces built a standard gauge military railway in the area. It was ceremonially put into operation by the German troops in Machault on 3 May 1916. The re-routing required extensive earthworks with deep and long cuts and high embankments, which German soldiers carried out with the help of an Oberursel benzene locomotive as well as with dump truck trains loaded by hand and by a Menck & Hambrock steam shovel excavator.

Langer Max 

The construction of a new position for the naval gun "Langer Max" began in March 1916. The Chief of Staff of the 3rd Army, Colonel Fritz von Lossberg reported to the Supreme Army Command (Oberste Heeresleitung, O.H.L.) on 19 May 1916 that the gun would be ready for action near Semide from 22 May 1916. It was to be used to fire at two railway junctions at a suitable time without revealing the top secret location of the well camouflaged gun too early. In August 1916, the 3rd Army received 25 rounds of 38-cm ammunition by order of the Supreme Army Command.

According to French accounts, there was no significant damage to property and no casualties. On 11 and 15 November 1916, Sainte-Menehould was shelled with the remaining 10 shells, reportedly resulting in several wounded.

Stations

External links 

 La petite gare de Charbogne et les autres du réseau secondaire des Ardennes. With many photos.

References 

Railway lines in Grand Est
Railway lines in Hauts-de-France
Military railways
600 mm gauge railways in France
800 mm gauge railways
Metre gauge railways in France
Standard gauge railways in France
Chemins de fer départementaux des Ardennes